Yevgeni Yuryevich Kranatov (born 22 November 1962) is a Russian football coach and a former player. He works as an assistant coach with FC Anzhi-Yunior Zelenodolsk.

References

1962 births
Sportspeople from Kazan
Living people
Soviet footballers
FC Mordovia Saransk players
FC Rubin Kazan players
FC Dynamo Kirov players
FC Shinnik Yaroslavl players
Russian footballers
Russian Premier League players
FC KAMAZ Naberezhnye Chelny players
Association football goalkeepers
FC Torpedo Moscow players
FC Neftekhimik Nizhnekamsk players